Luke Foley (born 8 October 1999) is an Australian rules footballer who plays for the West Coast Eagles in the Australian Football League (AFL). Commonly referred to as the Goat, he was recruited by West Coast with the 31st draft pick in the 2018 AFL draft.

Early football
A West Coast Eagles supporter growing up, Foley played for the Sorrento-Duncraig Hawks Junior Football Club for the majority of his junior career, participating in 2 grand finals and winning one premiership in 2014. During his time with Subiaco he played 16 games and kicked 3 goals, and averaged 12 disposals a game. He also represented Western Australia in the AFL Under 18 Championships, playing 3 games, kicking 2 goals and averaging 17.3 disposals a game.

AFL career
On debut, Foley collected 3 disposals, 2 marks and a tackle.

Statistics
 Statistics are correct to the end of 2020

|- 
! scope="row" style="text-align:center" | 2019
|  || 29 || 0 || — || — || — || — || — || — || — || — || — || — || — || — || — || —
|- style="background-color: #EAEAEA"
! scope="row" style="text-align:center" | 2020
|style="text-align:center;"|
| 29 || 1 || 0 || 0 || 3 || 0 || 3 || 2 || 1 || 0.0 || 0.0 || 3.0 || 0.0 || 3.0 || 2.0 || 1.0
|- style="background:#EAEAEA; font-weight:bold; width:2em"
| scope="row" text-align:center class="sortbottom" colspan=3 | Career
| 1
| 0
| 0
| 3
| 0
| 3
| 2
| 1
| 0.0
| 0.0
| 3.0
| 0.0
| 3.0
| 2.0
| 1.0
|}

References

External links

1999 births
Living people
West Coast Eagles players
Australian rules footballers from Western Australia
Subiaco Football Club players
West Coast Eagles (WAFL) players